Samia is a genus of moths in the family Saturniidae. The genus was erected by Jacob Hübner in 1819.

Species
Samia abrerai Naumann & Peigler, 2001
Samia canningi (Hutton, 1859)
Samia ceramensis (Bouvier, 1927)
Samia cynthia (Drury, 1773)
Samia fulva Jordan, 1911
Samia insularis (Snellen von Vollenhoven, 1862)
Samia kohlli Naumann & Peigler, 2001
Samia luzonica (Watson, 1914)
Samia naessigi Naumann & Peigler, 2001
Samia naumanni U. Paukstadt, Peigler & L. Paukstadt, 1998
Samia peigleri Naumann & Naessig, 1995
Samia pryeri (Butler, 1878)
Samia ricini (Donovan, 1798)
Samia tetrica (Rebel, 1924)
Samia treadawayi Naumann, 1998
Samia vandenberghi (Watson, 1915)
Samia wangi Naumann & Peigler, 2001
Samia watsoni (Oberthuer, 1914)
Samia yayukae U. Paukstadt, Peigler & L. Paukstadt, 1993

References

Saturniinae